Zyhdi Ohri (1870 – 1931), also known as Zuhdi bey Ohri was a 19th-century Albanian patriot, politician, and lawyer. He was a representative of Ohrid and Struga in the Assembly of Vlora held on November 28, 1912, and one of the 40 signatories of the Albanian Declaration of Independence.

Biography

Early life
Zyhdi Ohri was born in Ohrid, Manastir Vilayet of Ottoman Empire, today's North Macedonia. He completed the elementary school in one of the Ottoman schools in his home town. He studied jurisprudence at the University of Istanbul, where he then graduated as a lawyer. In the summer of 1897, Zyhdi Ohri returns to his homeland.

Patriotic and political activity
After returning from Istanbul, his nationalist ideologies began to emerge when, together with other prominent Albanian nationalists, such as Hamdi Ohri and Murad Sojliu, began organizing the peoples of the Ohrid, Strugë, and Velešta regions by forming cheta also preventing conscription by the Ottoman army.

As an Albanian nationalist, he participated in the League of Peja (1899-1900). He was member of the Secret Committee for the Liberation of Albania based in Monastir, and had his own cheta (guerrilla group) active during 1911-1912. In November 1912 he represented Ohrid in Vlore during the Albanian Declaration of Independence. He was one of the signatories, signing as "Zuhdi Ohri". He was appointed as counselor of the Head of Senate, position held by Vehbi Dibra.
 In 1920, he participated in the Congress of Lushnje.

References

External links

19th-century Albanian politicians
20th-century Albanian politicians
Signatories of the Albanian Declaration of Independence
Albanians from the Ottoman Empire
People from Ohrid
People from Manastir vilayet
All-Albanian Congress delegates
1870 births
1931 deaths